The District of Columbia's at-large congressional district is a congressional district based entirely of the District of Columbia. According to the U.S. Constitution, only states may be represented in the Congress of the United States. The District of Columbia is not a U.S. state and therefore has no voting representation. Instead, constituents in the district elect a non-voting delegate to the U.S. House of Representatives.

Despite lacking full voting privileges on the floor of the House of Representatives, delegates are voting members in U.S. Congressional committees and they lobby their congressional colleagues regarding the District's interests.  While the office was initially created during the Reconstruction Era by the Radical Republicans, Norton P. Chipman (R) briefly held the seat for less than two terms before the office was eliminated completely.  The District of Columbia Delegate Act ,  of 1970 authorized voters in the District of Columbia to elect one non-voting delegate to represent them in the United States House of Representatives.  The act was approved by Congress on September 22, 1970 and subsequently signed into law by President Richard Nixon. Democrat Walter E. Fauntroy was elected as the district's delegate to Congress in a special election on March 23, 1971, receiving 58 percent of the 116,635 votes cast.

Since 1993, when the House of Representatives has been under Democratic control, delegates, including the District of Columbia's delegate, have been allowed to cast non-binding floor votes when the House of Representatives was operating in the Committee of the Whole.

The district is currently represented by Democrat Eleanor Holmes Norton.

List of delegates representing the district

Election results

1870s

1970s

1980s

1990s

2000s

2010s

2020s

See also
District of Columbia voting rights
District of Columbia statehood movement
United States congressional delegations from the District of Columbia
List of United States congressional districts

References

External links
District of Columbia Congressional District map

At-large
At-large United States congressional districts
 
Constituencies established in 1871
1871 establishments in Washington, D.C.
Constituencies disestablished in 1875
1875 disestablishments in Washington, D.C.
Constituencies established in 1970
1970 establishments in Washington, D.C.